Benjamin Rivers is an independent game developer, illustrator, and comic artist.

Biography
Rivers was raised in Barry's Bay, Ontario, Canada and is now based out of Toronto, Ontario, Canada. He is a member of the Hand Eye Society and a graduate of the Artsy Games Incubator program. Rivers has been an active and early member of the Toronto independent gaming scene and has been creating games for download and display since 2008.

His games span multiple genres but often focus on similar visual styles. The various titles have appeared in Edge magazine, Game Developers Magazine and on Gamasutra, GameSetWatch, Destructoid, Maisonneuve, among others.

Destructoid called one of Rivers' games, Snow, "an American Splendor comic delivered by way of Monkey Island."

His graphic novel Snow is being made into a feature film by Ryan Couldrey. The film stars Nina Iordanova as Dana and is set for a release in October 2014. The film will be free to watch, but there will also be a paid version with bonus content. For the first 90 days of Snow's release, 100% of the proceeds from each purchase will go toward the Princess Margaret Cancer Centre, which serves as the premier cancer research institute and hospital in Canada.

Bibliography
Comic Books & Graphic Novels
All self-published
 2004. Empty Words #1
 2006. Empty Words #2
 2007. Empty Words #3
 2007. Empty Words #4
 2008. Empty Words, the complete series
 2008. Snow #1
 2009. Snow #2
 2010. Snow #3
 2010. The Husbanders
 2011. Snow #4
 2011. Snow, the complete series

Games
 2008. Snow the Game
 2009. The Ascent
 2010. Drunken Rampage
 2010. Missing
 2012. Home
 2015. Alone with You
 2019. Worse Than Death

References

External links
 
 "Drunken Rampage Interactive Drinking Game", GameSetWatch, 7 June 2010
 "Artsy Games", Maisonneuve, 13 January 2010
 "Artsy Games Creation", Game Developer Magazine Career Guide, 2009
 "The Ascent, TO Jam", GameSetWatch, 5 May 2009
 Site of Empty Words (graphic novel)
 Site of Snow (graphic novel)

Year of birth missing (living people)
Living people
Canadian illustrators
Indie video game developers